

Buildings and structures

Buildings
 1000 – The Chiesa di San Giuliano (Church of San Guliano) is built Ascoli Piceno, Italy.
 1001 – The Cathedral of Ani is built in Armenia.
 1001 – St. Michael's Church, Hildesheim begun.
 1002 – Brihadishwara Temple of Thanjavur, India (Chola Empire) begun.
 1003 – The Bagrati Cathedral's floor is laid in Kutaisi, Georgia.
 1004 – The Chiesa di San Giovanale is built in Orvieto, Italy.
 1008 – Rebuilt Torcello Cathedral in the Veneto consecrated.
 1009 – Abbey of Saint-Martin-du-Canigou in Casteil, Catalonia consecrated.
 Beginning of 11th century – Church of the Saviour at Berestove built.

References 

11th-century architecture
Architecture